Maria do Céu Whitaker Poças, known professionally as Céu (born 17 April 1980), is a Brazilian singer-songwriter whose first American album was released on the Six Degrees Records label in April 2007.

Career life 

She was born in São Paulo, Brazil, to a musical family. Her father was a composer, arranger, and musicologist. It was from her father that she learned to appreciate Brazil's classical music composers, particularly Heitor Villa-Lobos, Ernesto Nazaré, and Orlando Silva.

By age fifteen she had decided to become a musician and by her late teens, she had studied music theory, as well as the violão (nylon-stringed Brazilian guitar). Her songs reveal many influences, which include samba, salsa, choro, soul, rhythm and blues, hip hop, afrobeat, and electrojazz music.

She cites as influences the music of African-Americans Billie Holiday, Ella Fitzgerald, Lauryn Hill, Erykah Badu, and Jorge Ben.

Céu was performing onstage with major artists and exploring the repertoire of the machines (turn-of-the-century carnival music) by her late teens. Soon after that, she relocated temporarily to New York City, where she had a chance to meet with fellow Brazilian musician Antônio Pinto. She later learned that he was actually a distant cousin. Their relationship was renewed when he teamed up with lead producer Beto Villares, composer of the musical score for the movie O Ano em Que Meus Pais Saíram de Férias (2007), to help her record her album. Antonio Pinto, who produced Céu's song "Ave Cruz" is the composer of the musical score for two Oscar Nominated films, Central Station (1999) and City of God (2002).

Originally issued in 2005 on the São Paulo-based Urban Jungle, her self-titled debut album Céu was picked up by Six Degrees/Starbucks/Hear Music in the US and UK, JVC in Japan and Harmonia Mundi in France and in the Netherlands. For this album, Céu received a Latin Grammy nomination for "Best New Artist" in 2006 and a Grammy nomination for Best Contemporary World Music Album in 2008.

In 2009, her critically acclaimed second album Vagarosa reached No. 2 on the US Billboard's World Music charts. The album has since been nominated for a 2010 Latin Grammy Award for Best Brazilian Contemporary Pop Album. In 2010, Céu was invited by Herbie Hancock to record a version of "Tempo de Amor" for The Imagine Project album.

In 2011, she contributed a version of the track "It's a Long Way" in collaboration with Apollo Nove and N.A.S.A. for the Red Hot Organization's most recent charitable album Red Hot + Rio 2. The album is a follow-up to the 1996 Red Hot + Rio. In 2012, Céu received her third Latin Grammy nomination for "Best Contemporary Brazilian Pop Album" for her third album Caravana Sereia Bloom.

In 2014, she released her first live DVD/CD entitled Céu – Ao Vivo in Brazil. The concert was filmed in August 2014 in São Paulo and contains 15 tracks in total, including the never before released cover versions of all-time classics "Piel Canela" and "Mais Uma Noite de Amor", behind the scenes'' footage of the band and more. Céu – Ao Vivo also includes live versions of Céu's greatest hits, "Lenda", "Malemolência", "10 Contados", "Cangote" and "Baile de Ilusão".

In 2016, she released her fourth studio album named Tropix. She received critical acclaim from such publications as The Guardian and The New York Times. She also won, in the same year, her first Latin Grammy in the Best Portuguese Language Contemporary Pop Album category.

Her album APKÁ was considered one of the 25 best Brazilian albums of the second half of 2019 by the São Paulo Association of Art Critics.

Trivia 

 Céu (céu) means "sky" and "heaven" in Portuguese.
 The song "Malemolência" was featured on the soccer game by EA Sports, FIFA 08.
 Starbucks has promoted her album in its coffeehouses through its Hear Music Debut CD series. She was the first international artist chosen by Starbucks for promotion.
 Céu performed at the opening ceremony of the 2007 Pan American Games.
 In 2008 Céu formed the São Paulo collective Sonantes with Brazilian musicians and producers Rica Amabis, Gui Amabis, Pupillo, and Dengue.
 Céu is one of the relatively few Brazilian artists who has performed at the Coachella Valley Music and Arts Festival (2010).
 Between 2013 and 2014 Céu performed a series of concerts in Brazil to celebrate the 40th Anniversary of the release of Bob Marley and the Wailers’ legendary album Catch a Fire.
 She is the second cousin of Maria Casadevall (a popular Brazilian actress with more than 13 years of career). She is the eldest of the two cousins (Céu is 7 years older than Casadevall).

Discography 
 Céu (2005)
 Remixed EP (2007)
 Vagarosa (2009)
 Caravana Sereia Bloom (2012)
 Céu – Ao Vivo (2014)
 Tropix (2016)
 Apká! (2019)
 Um Gosto de Sol (2021)

Awards and nominations

References

External links 
 Official Web Site
 "Céu's Brazilian Melting Pot"
 "Singer Ceu brings sexy back to Brazilian music"
 "CéU: From Brazil with Love"
 "Ave Cruz" – free mp3 at music.download.com
 Urban Jungle

1980 births
Living people
Bossa nova singers
Música Popular Brasileira singers
Singers from São Paulo
Latin Grammy Award winners
21st-century Brazilian singers
21st-century Brazilian women singers
Brazilian soul singers
Six Degrees Records artists
Women in Latin music